George Walton Comprehensive High School, also known as Walton High School, is a public high school located in Marietta, Georgia, United States. It is in eastern Cobb County and is a charter school in the Cobb County School District. It is a School of Excellence and the number one public school in the state. It is the largest high school in the East Cobb area.

For many years Walton has been among the top high schools in Georgia in SAT scores. In 2006, almost 800 Walton students took over 1,800 Advanced Placement exams, making it the school with the greatest number of test-takers in Georgia. Walton was also one of six featured "Outstanding American High Schools" out of 96 total by U.S. News & World Report in 1999 because of its high parental involvement and overall high level of achievement.  In 2011, Walton was ranked 67 by Newsweek based on new factors: graduation rate (25%), college matriculation rate (25%), AP tests taken per graduate (25%), average SAT/ACT scores (10%), average AP/IB/AICE scores (10%), and AP courses offered (5%).

History

Construction of Walton High School began in 1973, and the school opened in 1975. Various sections of the school have been renovated, and entirely new halls have been added continuously, each time with their own distinct type of architecture and style.  Throughout these many years of construction, especially in recent years, mobile classrooms, colloquially called "trailers," were added to accommodate for the classrooms rendered unavailable.  A small number were still in use until 2017, when a replacement building opened.

Walton has been a Georgia School of Excellence since the program's creation in 1984, and in the same year was recognized as a National Blue Ribbon School of Excellence. Walton became a charter school in 1998.

Dumb and Dumberer

Portions of the 2003 movie Dumb and Dumberer: When Harry Met Lloyd were filmed in the Walton auto shop, science rooms, and cafeteria. The basketball gym was painted over with the film's fictional logo, and to replace it, part of the film's budget went towards buying a new floor for the entire gym, which was removed in summer 2019 as part of the renovations of the school. The logo of the old gym is framed near the entrance to the new gym.

Faculty

121 full-time and 15 part-time teachers are employed at Walton, as well as seven full-time and two part-time administrators. Including other special resource teachers and support staff, Walton has 174 full-time and 21 part-time employees.  The student-teacher ratio is 20:1, above the state average of 14:1.

Charter

Walton gained charter status in 1998, which was renewed in 2003, 2008, and 2012. Walton's administration has made several changes to the school's policy and schedule, among other areas, through this. One of the changes is the Walton Governance Council, which replaces the original local council in matters pertaining to the maintenance of the charter and its renewal every five years. This larger and more diverse council was also a change given by the charter itself to better represent its stakeholders (students, parents, teachers, administrators, and others).

Possibly Walton's most noticeable change is the Walton Enrichment Block, or WEB, which shortens classes one day a week (usually Wednesday) to provide students several hours to complete missed assignments, receive individual instruction, or simply leave early. WEBs only occur on weeks without any other events such as county-mandated teacher workdays or early releases.

Walton also allows students to take additional classes before and after school. Many students today take advantage of 0 Period to take an additional course each day before the normal school day begins. 0 period is also included in the "Flex Schedule," in which students may leave after 6th period by taking a 0 period class, thus still giving six classes and a lunch period.

The petition adopted in 2008 also proposes a new method of evaluating teachers called the "Collaborative Growth Model," a release from mandated End of Course Test days that conflict with AP exams, and recognition of Project Lead the Way courses as being worthy of half a quality point towards a grade point average.

Extracurricular activities

The school offers many clubs, groups, and societies exist for a variety of interests. Walton has a Beta Club, a National Honor Society, and a Habitat for Humanity group. It also has a Politically Active Citizens, and a Future Physicians Club. Aside from general interest groups, service clubs, and honor societies, students may participate in various sports, fine arts, and academic organizations.

Athletics

Walton has won the GADA Dodge AAAAA Directors Cup four times since its creation in 1999 for having superior overall athletic performance and five consecutive volleyball championships from 1999 to 2002. In recent years, it has won state championships in boys' tennis, led by outgoing team captain Mitch Lyons, girls' tennis, boys' soccer (2006, 2008, 2011), and boys' baseball. Also in 2011, the men's lacrosse team had an undefeated year where they won the school's first lacrosse  championship, and made a promising run in the 2014 season under new Head Coach Griffin Spotz, making it to the semi-finals. In 2004, the Walton Raider football team went undefeated in their region. The Raiders beat Valdosta High School in the state quarter-finals to advance to the state semi-finals at the Georgia Dome, before falling to Parkview High School. In 2007, the Raiders were again region champions, beating the previous state champion and nationally ranked Roswell High School, and the last undefeated team Martin Luther King, Jr. High School in the state quarter-finals to advance to the state semi-finals before falling to North Gwinnett High School at the Georgia Dome.

The boys' curling team, which was started in 2007, won its first state championship in 2008 after just one year of training. They went on to nationals, only to finish in last place.

The Raider rugby team, founded in 2007, won its third straight state high school championship in 2010. Raider Rugby is still a club team but is currently working on becoming a school-supported sport.

"Raider Valley", the home field of the Walton Raiders, went through some major renovations during the summer of 2010. The football team raised enough money to build a new stadium. The Raiders put in a new football field, along with a top-of-the-line Jumbotron score board. The renovations took place all summer; the new turf field is meant to be beneficial to all outdoor activities.

Academic

The Walton Academic Bowl team won the GATA varsity state championship from 2004 to 2006.  It has won numerous prestigious awards, and its members won the American Academic Challenge in 1995.

The Science Bowl team won the state championship in 2004, 2005, 2008, 2010, 2011, and 2012, and also placed third in the 2005 national competition.

The Math Team has won the state championship nine times. The team has won numerous tournaments and awards in the past few years. Many of the members are also members of the Georgia ARML team. The Walton MathFest, a math tournament and conference for high school students, is hosted by the team in the spring.

Walton Mock Trial won their regional competition for four years consecutively, in 2007, 2008, 2009, and 2010, with many individual students winning awards at both the regional competition and the state competition. The program continues to grow more competitive each year.

Other academic extracurriculars include Debate Team and the Raider Script magazine.

Notable alumni
 Blaine Boyer (1999), professional baseball player (Atlanta Braves, St. Louis Cardinals, Arizona Diamondbacks, New York Mets)
 Billy Burns (2008), professional baseball player with the New York Yankees
 Robin Finck (1990), guitarist for Nine Inch Nails and Guns N' Roses
 Ryan Harrow (2010), professional basketball player
 Chris Hollod (2001), venture capitalist and angel investor
 Aaron Kelly, wide receiver for the Clemson Tigers; became wide receiver in the CFL
 Carter Kieboom, (2016), MLB shortstop for the Washington Nationals
 Spencer Kieboom (2009), MLB catcher for the Washington Nationals
 Kevin Kruger (2002), head basketball coach, University of Nevada Las Vegas
 Scott MacRae (1992), professional baseball player (Cincinnati Reds)
 Thomas Morton (2001), Vice correspondent
 Marc Pisciotta (1988), professional baseball player (Chicago Cubs, Kansas City Royals)
 Luke Putkonen (2004), professional baseball player (Detroit Tigers)
 Glen Rice Jr. (2009), professional basketball player Washington Wizards, 2017-18 top scorer in the Israel Basketball Premier League
 Chris Robinson, musician and founding member, with Rich Robinson, of the rock band The Black Crowes; formed the band in 1984 (which was originally called Mr. Crowes Garden) while the two attended Walton
 Rich Robinson, musician and founding member, with Chris Robinson, of the rock band The Black Crowes; formed the band in 1984 (which was originally called Mr. Crowes Garden) while the two attended Walton
 Jeff Small (1991), co-CEO of Amblin
 Chris Stowers (1992), professional baseball player (Montreal Expos)
 Chase Thomas (2008), All-State defensive end and All-American linebacker at Stanford University

References

External links 

Schools in Cobb County, Georgia
Public high schools in Georgia (U.S. state)
Charter schools in Georgia (U.S. state)
Educational institutions established in 1975
1975 establishments in Georgia (U.S. state)
Buildings and structures in Marietta, Georgia